The House of Daemon was a comic strip published in the British comic book Eagle, from issue 25 (dated September 11, 1982) to issue 47 (dated February 12, 1983). It was written by Alan Grant and John Wagner, and drawn by José Ortiz.

Synopsis

The strip was a horror-themed adventure about architect Elliot Aldrich, who had constructed a dream house for his wife Cassandra. However, despite being built on a deserted rock outcrop, the house became possessed by an "evil presence" calling itself Daemon (pronounced "dee-mon"). After a short period of paranormal activity, Daemon was able to trap the Aldritches, along with workmen, police, and paranormal investigators, in nightmarish worlds of his own devising 'inside' each area of the house.

Daemon's abilities seemed limited only by his own demented imagination; for example, the kitchen became a large jungle which took several days to cross, in a futuristic recreation of the Vietnam War. In this way, the strip appeared to be a forerunner to The Thirteenth Floor, which had both the same creative team and the same 'virtual torture' concept.

Over the course of the story, Cassandra was revealed to possess psychic powers, that enabled the group to battle Daemon; for example, by navigating through the house despite its appearance. She also located three apparent "wizards" in a peaceful sanctuary within the building's lounge. They revealed that they and Daemon were from the 26th century, where humanity had perfected psychic powers, but not evil. Daemon, an exceptionally powerful "child of darkness", was imprisoned within the still-standing house that Aldritch had built with the three wizards combining their power to act as his jailers. However, Daemon was able to reach over half a millennium into the past, to torture those on the site of his future prison, with the wizards only able to follow him, not stop him.

Eventually, they located Daemon in the house's attic. The people supposedly killed in the house were revealed to be alive, due to Daemon's reality-manipulation abilities; he intended to torture them indefinitely. Cassandra herself temporarily defeated his physical form with poison, and the group escaped. Elliot Aldrich and his building firm encircled the house with high brick walls, hopefully isolating Daemon within until his imprisonment in the 26th Century.

Reception
The House of Daemon was positively received by critics; Joel Harley of Starburst, reviewing a 2015 re-release of the comic, praised its characterisation and deemed it "one of the best-looking horror comcis of all time".

References

British comics
Eagle (comic) characters
Eagle comic strips